John Joseph McVeigh (born 13 May 1965) is a former Australian politician. He was elected to the House of Representatives at the 2016 federal election, representing the Division of Groom. He was a member of the Liberal National Party of Queensland and sat in the Liberal party room. During the Turnbull Government he served in cabinet as Minister for Regional Development, Territories and Local Government from 2017 to 2018. He previously served in the Legislative Assembly of Queensland from 2012 to 2016 and was Minister for Agriculture, Fisheries and Forestry under Premier Campbell Newman.

Early life
McVeigh was born on 13 May 1965 in Allora, Queensland. His father Tom McVeigh was a federal Nationals MP from 1972 to 1988 for Groom and its predecessor, Darling Downs, and served as a minister in the Fraser Government. McVeigh grew up on a grain farm on the Darling Downs, and was educated at Jondaryan State School, St Joseph's College, and Downlands College. He holds the degrees of Bachelor of Business from the University of Southern Queensland, Master of Business Administration from Bond University and Doctor of Philosophy from the University of Queensland. He began his PhD in 2005 through the Cooperative Research Centre for Irrigation Futures and was awarded the degree in 2012, by which time he had become state agricultural minister. His thesis was titled "Influencing sustainable water use in Australian irrigated agriculture: a value chain management approach".

Prior to entering politics McVeigh worked in agribusiness. He entered the Bank of Queensland's graduate program as an executive trainee in 1986. He later worked as a sales representative for Elders Pastoral (1986–1988), marketing coordinator for Cargill Seeds Australia (1988–1990), and market development officer for the state Department of Primary Industries (1990–1992). He then co-founded a management consulting firm, Ellis Foster McVeigh, and served as managing director from 1992 to 2008.

McVeigh was president of the Toowoomba branch of the Young Nationals from 1987 to 1988. He served on the Toowoomba Regional Council from 2008 to 2012.

State politics
McVeigh served as a member of the Legislative Assembly of Queensland for Toowoomba South between 2012 and 2016; and served as the Queensland Government Minister for Agriculture, Fisheries and Forestry from 3 April 2012 until 14 February 2015. After the LNP lost the 2015 state election he served as Shadow Minister for Science, Information Technology and Innovation. On 9 April 2016, the LNP announced that McVeigh had been preselected to contest Groom at the 2016 federal election. His resignation from the Queensland Parliament on 29 April 2016 triggered a by-election in the district of Toowoomba South.

Federal politics
In April 2016, McVeigh won LNP preselection for the Division of Groom, which his father had held 30 years earlier. He was endorsed by the retiring member, Ian Macfarlane. He retained the seat for the LNP at the 2016 federal election and sat with the Liberal Party.

Following a ministerial reshuffle in December 2017, McVeigh was promoted to cabinet as Minister for Regional Development, Territories and Local Government. He said that Prime Minister Malcolm Turnbull was looking to increase the representation of regional Queensland. He and David Littleproud were the first MPs elected in 2016 to be promoted to cabinet. McVeigh did not retain his position when Scott Morrison succeeded Turnbull as prime minister in August 2018. In the two leadership spills, he supported Turnbull against Dutton in the first vote and Dutton against Morrison in the second.

On 18 September 2020, McVeigh announced his immediate resignation from parliament. He said that he needed to concentrate on caring for his wife Anita, who was suffering from a major illness.

Personal life
McVeigh has one son and five daughters with his wife Anita, whom he married in 1987.

References

 

1965 births
Living people
Liberal National Party of Queensland members of the Parliament of Australia
Members of the Queensland Legislative Assembly
Queensland local councillors
University of Southern Queensland alumni
Bond University alumni
University of Queensland alumni
Members of the Australian House of Representatives
Members of the Australian House of Representatives for Groom
21st-century Australian politicians
Members of the Cabinet of Australia
Turnbull Government
Government ministers of Australia